Charles Joseph Atkinson (born 6 October 2001) is an English professional rugby union player for Leicester Tigers in the Gallagher Premiership.

Early life and education
Atkinson's father played rugby for Tynedale RFC, Northumberland and had England Under-18 trials.

Atkinson first played rugby at Oxford RFC, aged five. He was educated at Abingdon School from 2013 until 2020 and played in the first XV rugby team. Atkinson played twice for England U-18.

Rugby playing career
In 2020 Atkinson signed for Wasps on a three year contract. 
He is known for beating defenders, try scoring, and also for physical commitment in defence. This contract ended in 2022 after Wasps went under, he signed for Leicester Tigers in October 2022.

On 1 January 2021 Atkinson was selected for the England Under-20 Squad and on 26 January 2021 it was announced that he would be part of the shadow squad for England during the 2021 Six Nations Championship. Later that year he was a member of the junior squad that completed a grand slam during the 2021 Six Nations Under 20s Championship.

In June 2022 Atkinson was called up by coach Eddie Jones to join a training camp with the senior England squad.

Following Wasps administration in October 2022, Atkinson signed a "long term" contract with Leicester Tigers on 31 October 2022. He made his debut as a replacement in Tigers 1 point defeat away to Bath on 11 November 2022.

See also
 List of Old Abingdonians

References

External links 
 

2001 births
Living people
English rugby union players
People educated at Abingdon School
Rugby union fly-halves
Rugby union players from Oxford
Wasps RFC players
Leicester Tigers players